Porphyrobaphe is a  genus of land snails in the family Orthalicidae.

Species 
Species in the genus Porphyrobaphe:
 Porphyrobaphe approximata  Fulton, 1896 
 Porphyrobaphe augusti Jousseaume, 1887
 Porphyrobaphe iostoma  Sowerby, 1824 
 Porphyrobaphe iris  Pfeiffer, 1852 
 Porphyrobaphe irrorata  L. A. Reeve, 1849
 Porphyrobaphe saturnus (L. Pfeiffer, 1860)
 Porphyrobaphe subirroratus (Da Costa, 1898)
Synonyms
 Porphyrobaphe dennisoni (Reeve, 1848): synonym of Hemibulimus dennisoni (Reeve, 1848) (superseded combination)
 Porphyrobaphe galactostoma Ancey, 1890: synonym of Sultana yatesi galactostomus (Ancey, 1890) (original combination)
 Porphyrobaphe grandis Rolle, 1902: synonym of Sultana yatesi yatesi (L. Pfeiffer, 1855) (junior synonym)
 Porphyrobaphe latevittata Shuttleworth, 1856: synonym of Sultana yatesi yatesi (L. Pfeiffer, 1855) (junior synonym)
 Porphyrobaphe sarcostoma Ancey, 1903: synonym of Sultana yatesi yatesi (L. Pfeiffer, 1855) (junior synonym)
 Porphyrobaphe sublabeo Ancey, 1890: synonym of Sultana yatesi yatesi (L. Pfeiffer, 1855) (junior synonym)
 Porphyrobaphe vicaria Fulton, 1896: synonym of Sultana yatesi vicaria (Fulton, 1896) (original name)
 Porphyrobaphe victor (L. Pfeiffer, 1854): synonym of Clathrorthalicus victor (L. Pfeiffer, 1854) (unaccepted combination)

References 

 Bank, R. A. (2017). Classification of the Recent terrestrial Gastropoda of the World. Last update: July 16th, 2017

External links
 Shuttleworth, R. J. (1856). Beiträge zur näheren Kenntniss der Mollusken. Notitiae Malacologicae. 1: 1-90, pls 1-9.
 Strebel, H. (1909). Revision der Unterfamilie der Orthalicinen. Jahrbuch der Hamburgischen Wissenschaftlichen Anstalten. 26 (Beiheft 2): 191 pp, 23 pl.
 Breure, A. S. H. & Araujo, R. (2017). The Neotropical land snails (Mollusca, Gastropoda) collected by the “Comisión Científica del Pacífico.”. PeerJ. 5, e3065.
 Albers, J. C.; Martens, E. von. (1860). Die Heliceen nach natürlicher Verwandtschaft systematisch geordnet von Joh. Christ. Albers. Ed. 2. Pp. i-xviii, 1-359. Leipzig: Engelman

Orthalicidae